San Joaquin Church may refer to:

Philippines
San Joaquin Church (Iloilo)

United States
San Joaquin Church (Ensenada, New Mexico), listed on the National Register of Historic Places